Sir Ivan John Lawrence  (born 24 December 1936) is a former British Conservative Member of Parliament and criminal barrister.

Early life and legal career
Born in Brighton, Lawrence was the only child of parents of Russian-Romanian Jewish descent. Alma Cogan, a successful singer of traditional pop music in the post-war period, was his cousin. Lawrence was educated at the former Brighton, Hove and Sussex Grammar School and is President of the School's Old Boys' Association. He read jurisprudence at Christ Church, Oxford, where he became president of the Oxford University Progressive Jewish Society. From 1955 to 1957, he did National Service in the RAF and served in Malta during the Suez Crisis.

He was called to the Bar by the Inner Temple in 1962; appointed Queen's Counsel in 1981, a Recorder of the Crown Court in 1985, a Bencher of the Inner Temple in 1990; and was knighted in 1992. He has defended in over 90 murder trials, and has appeared in a number of notable criminal trials, for example the Kray twins (gang-land murders), the serial killer Dennis Nilsen, Russell Bishop (Brighton Babes in the Wood murder), the Mountnessing silver bullion robbery, the Brink's-Mat gold bullion money-laundering, and a mass-murder war crimes trial at The Hague. Most recently he has co-chaired the 38th Cambridge International Symposium on Economic Crime at Jesus College.

Political career
Lawrence, having twice unsuccessfully stood for the Peckham constituency in 1966 and 1970, was elected MP for Burton in February 1974.  He held the seat until May 1997 when he lost to Labour's Janet Dean.

He was a member of the Conservative Monday Club in 1973 when in the autumn of that year he had contributed an article to Monday News on the subject of "The Problem of State Subsidised Strikers". He is listed as a Club MP in May 1975, in a Club office list as one of their MP members in July 1976, and in a Club members' circular as one of its members standing for re-election to Parliament for Burton in the General Election on 9 June 1983. He was still on the List of Club MPs in 1990. He has also been a member of the Conservative Bow Group for over 50 years and has contributed to many of its publications over that period.

He was Chairman of the Home Affairs Select Committee from 1992 to 1997 and was Chairman of the Commonwealth Parliamentary Association (UK Branch) from 1995 to 1997. He was a member of the Foreign Affairs Select Committee from 1982 to 1992, and served on a number of other Parliamentary Committees concerned with health, employment, social services and law and order.

He was chairman of the Conservative Friends of Israel and was a member of the executive committee of the 1922 Committee for a number of years.  His private member's bill in 1991 instigated the national lottery, and in 1985 he made the longest speech in Parliament that century (on the Water Fluoridation Bill).

Post-parliamentary career
Lawrence is now a member of 5 Pump Court Chambers, a Fellow of the Society for Advanced Legal Studies, was an elected member of the Bar Council (2004–2010) and is Visiting Professor of Law at the University of Buckingham. He was admitted to the degree of Doctor of Laws "Honoris Causa" by the University in March 2013. In April 2015, he became a Visiting-Professor at the BPP University Law School. He is well known as an after-dinner and cruise-line speaker. His memoir, My Life of Crime: cases and causes, was published by Book Guild on 30 September 2010 and reprinted in paperback on 1 February 2012.

He is a Freeman of the City of London, vice-president of the Society of Conservative Lawyers, President of the Spelthorne constituency Conservative Association, a deputy for the Board of Deputies of British Jews for 40 years, and was a trustee of the Holocaust Educational Trust.

Personal life
He married Gloria, whom he had met at the Oxford University Progressive Jewish Society, at the West London Synagogue in April 1966. She died of brain cancer, following terminal lung cancer, on 4 October 2016. They had one daughter, Rachel Lawrence, a criminal barrister for 21 years, an amateur actress, pianist, a former CF Achiever of the Year and who even once appeared on ITV's Blind Date. She died of lung failure caused by cystic fibrosis, aged 45 years on 6 September 2013.

In popular culture 
Lawrence was portrayed by Pip Torrens in Des, a 2020 docudrama focusing on Dennis Nilsen.

References

External links
  5 Pump Court Chambers
 Speeches in the House of Commons

1936 births
Living people
Alumni of Christ Church, Oxford
Conservative Party (UK) MPs for English constituencies
English Jews
English people of Russian-Jewish descent
English people of Romanian-Jewish descent
English King's Counsel
Jewish British politicians
Knights Bachelor
People educated at Brighton, Hove and Sussex Grammar School
People from Brighton
Politicians awarded knighthoods
UK MPs 1974
UK MPs 1974–1979
UK MPs 1979–1983
UK MPs 1983–1987
UK MPs 1987–1992
UK MPs 1992–1997
British Eurosceptics